U-32 can refer to:

 , one of several German submarines
 , a U-27-class submarine of the Austro-Hungarian Navy
 Union 32 High School, a regional high school in East Montpelier, Vermont
 u32, a name for the 32-bit unsigned integer, especially in Rust